148 athletes (123 men and 25 women) from France competed at the 1996 Summer Paralympics in Atlanta, United States.

Medallists

See also
France at the Paralympics
France at the 1996 Summer Olympics

References 

Nations at the 1996 Summer Paralympics
1996
Summer Paralympics